Howard Russell may refer to:
 Howard Hyde Russell (1855–1946), American prohibitionist
 Howard S. Russell (1887–1980), American gardener, writer, and politician

See also
Russell Howard (disambiguation)